Salmas is a city in the Central District of Salmas County, West Azerbaijan province, Iran, and serves as capital of the county. It is located northwest of Lake Urmia, near Turkey.

At the 2006 census, its population was 79,560 in 19,806 households. The following census in 2011 counted 88,196 people in 23,751 households. The latest census in 2016 showed a population of 92,811 people in 27,115 households. According to the 2019 census, the city's population is 127,864. The majority of the population is composed of Azerbaijanis and Kurds with some Armenians, Assyrians, and Jews.

History

Etymology and early history

According to Encyclopædia Britannica the earliest historic recognition of Salmas could be found at the time of Ardashir I's reign (224–242 AD) via a petroglyph of him on horseback while receiving surrender of the Parthian personage. In another contribution by Britannica, on an animated political map of Sassanid Empire at the time of Shapur I's reign (240–270 AD), Salmas is markedly acknowledged as one of the renown and apparently important cities of the empire with the same original name as now. There is a speculation that the nickname of the city, Shapur, might be derived from the name of this king (of kings) of Persia.

Salmas was held by the Kurdish Rawadid dynasty and frequented by the Hadhabani tribe in the 10-11th centuries. Al-Maqdisi described it as a Kurdish town who had built a wall around the city.

Another Mention of the city was made in 1281, when its Assyrian bishop made the trip to the consecration of the Assyrian Church of the East patriarch Yaballaha in Baghdad.

In the Battle of Salmas on 17–18 September 1429, the Kara Koyunlu were defeated by Shah Rukh who was consolidating Timurid holdings west of Lake Urmia. However, the area was retaken by the Kara Koyunlu in 1447 after the death of Shah Rukh.

In March 1915 Cevdet Bey ordered 800 Assyrians of Salmas to be killed. Mar Shimun, the Patriarch of the Assyrian Church of the East was murdered by the Kurdish chieftain Simko Shikak in Salmas in March 1918.<ref>O'Shea, Maria T. (2004) "Trapped Between the Map and Reality: Geography and Perceptions of Kurdistan Routledge, New York, page 100, </ref> 

Around the advent of the 1910s, Imperial Russia started to station infantry and Cossacks in Salmas. The Russians retreated at the time of Enver Pasha's offensive in the Iran-Caucasus region, but returned in early 1916, and stayed up to the wake of the Russian Revolution.

Geography

Salmas in early atlases
The atlases below are some of the earliest maps to have been ever sketched to show the territory and originality of the name of Salmas and are some of the strongest documents providing proofs to some basic facts about the city including its existence and identity.

Climate
Under the Köppen climate classification, using the  isotherm, Salmas features a continental climate (Dsa''), and is thus the one of the few cities in the Middle East and one of the 6 in the country with this categorization.

Notable people
 Stepanos V of Salmast (d. 1567) – Catholicos of the Armenian Apostolic Church
 Yohannan Gabriel (1758–1833) – Chaldean Catholic bishop of Salmas
 Nicholas I Zaya (d. 1855) –  Patriarch of Babylon of the Chaldeans
 Raffi (1835–1888) –  Armenian novelist
 Paul Bedjan (1838–1920) – Chaldean Catholic priest and orientalist
 Abraham Guloyan (1893–1983) – Politician
 Murad Kostanyan (1902–1989) – Actor
 Hossein Sadaghiani (1903-1982) - The first ever manager and head coach of Iran national football team (1941-1951) and the first ever Iranian soccer player to play for foreign clubs (R. Charleroi S.C. and Fenerbahce SK) and in a European league
 Ardeshir Ovanessian (c. 1905–1990) – Communist leader
 Timur Lakestani (1915–2011) – aka Father of Iranian Electrical Industry
 Jafar Salmasi (1918–2000) – weightlifter
 Emmanuel Agassi (1930–2021) – boxer and father of Andre Agassi
 Hadi Asghari (b. 1981) – football player

Gallery

See also

1930 Salmas earthquake
Nor Shirakan
Battle of Dilman
Assyrian homeland
Khoy Khanate

References

Sources

External links

Salmas famous people
"Salmas Map – Satellite Images of Salmas", Maplandia

Cities in West Azerbaijan Province

Populated places in Salmas County

Mass murder in 1915

Kurdish settlements in West Azerbaijan Province